James Bottomley may refer to:
 James Bottomley (diplomat) (1920–2013), British diplomat
 Jim Bottomley (1900–1959), American baseball player
 James Thomson Bottomley (1845–1926), Irish-born British physicist